The Athletics Competition at the 1995 Pan American Games was held in Mar del Plata, Argentina between 17 and 25 March.

Medal summary

Men's events

Women's events

Medal table

Participating nations

References
GBR Athletics

 
1995
Athletics
Pan American Games
1995 Pan American Games